Lusk was an American psychedelic rock supergroup featuring members from Tool, Replicants, Failure and Medicine.

History
The band formed when bassist Paul D'Amour, having recently departed from Tool, and keyboardist Chris Pitman got together.  Greg Edwards and Brad Laner joined them shortly afterward.  Their only album Free Mars was released in 1997 on Volcano Entertainment.  Though the album was not extremely successful, it was nominated for a Grammy in 1998 for Best Recording Package.  The music video for Backworlds, co-directed by D'Amour and Len E. Burge III, was featured on MTV's 120 Minutes and 12 Angry Viewers.

Legal troubles with their label Volcano Entertainment which was undergoing a transformation coupled with increasing activities apart from the group by all members caused Lusk to quietly disband in the late 1990s.

Members
Paul D'Amour – guitar, backing vocals, effects
Chris Pitman – piano, keyboards, harpsichord, vibraphone, backing vocals, effects
Greg Edwards – bass, synthesizer, guitar
Brad Laner – drums, guitar, effects
Chris Wyse - Bass (touring only)

Discography
Albums
Free Mars (1997, Volcano)
Singles
"Backworlds" (1997, Volcano)

References

Psychedelic rock music groups from California
Volcano Entertainment artists
Zoo Entertainment (record label) artists
Musical groups disestablished in 1998
Musical groups established in 1995
Rock music supergroups